Pier Giacomo Grampa (born 28 October 1936) is an Italian Roman Catholic bishop.

Ordained to the priesthood on 6 December 1959, Grampa was named bishop of the Roman Catholic Diocese of Lugano, Switzerland on 18 December 2003 and retired on 4 November 2013.

References

1936 births
Living people
People from Busto Arsizio
20th-century Italian Roman Catholic priests
21st-century Roman Catholic bishops in Switzerland